Milarrochy Bay is a bay on Loch Lomond, in southern Scotland. It is near the village of Balmaha.

There are a few houses near the bay. Other bays on the east of Loch Lomond include Cashel Bay and Sallochy Bay. The bay has a visitor centre, where you can pick up leaflets about Loch Lomond and The Trossachs National Park and the surrounding area. There is also a camping and caravanning club site.

The bay is popular with hikers on the West Highland Way, and photographers, who come to capture the famous Milarrochy Bay "lone tree"

References

Bays of Scotland
Protected areas of Stirling (council area)
Nature reserves in Scotland
Landforms of Stirling (council area)